Park In-hwan (born January 6, 1945) is a South Korean actor.

Filmography

Film

Television series

Web series

Variety show

Theater

Awards and nominations

State honors

Notes

References

External links
 
 
 

1945 births
Living people
People from Cheongju
20th-century South Korean male actors
21st-century South Korean male actors
South Korean male film actors
South Korean male television actors
South Korean male stage actors
South Korean male musical theatre actors
South Korean male web series actors
Chung-Ang University alumni
Best Actor Paeksang Arts Award (theatre) winners